Starr is a family name, originating from the pre-Modern English word starre or sterre, meaning "star".

People
 Allison Starr (born 1977), American collegiate basketball player and coach 
 Antony Starr (born 1975), New Zealand television actor
 Bart Starr (1934–2019), American football quarterback and coach
 Beau Starr (born 1944), American actor
 Belle Starr (1848–1889), American outlaw
 Blaze Starr (1932–2015), American stripper and burlesque star
 Bobbi Starr (born 1983), stage name of an American pornographic actress
 Brenda K. Starr (born 1966), American singer
 Bruce Starr (born 1969), American politician in Oregon
 Charles Starr (born 1933), American politician in Oregon
 Charmaine Starr (born 1979), Filipino pornographic actress
 Chauncey Starr (1912–2007), American nuclear physicist
 Chester G. Starr (1914–1999), American historian
 Comfort Starr (1589–1659, English physician
 Cornelius Vander Starr (1892–1968), a founder of the American International Group insurance corporation
 David Starr (born 1967), American race car driver
 David Starr (wrestler) (born 1991), American wrestler
 Don Starr (1917–1995), American actor
 Edwin Starr (1942–2003), American soul and R&B singer
 Ernest Starr (1890–1981), Canadian politician
 Freddie Starr (1943–2019), English comedian, impressionist and singer
 Frederick Starr (1858–1933), American anthropologist
 S. Frederick Starr (born 1940), American founder and chairman of the Central Asia-Caucasus Institute
 Fredro Starr, born Fred Scruggs (born 1970), American rapper and actor
 G. Gabrielle Starr, president of Pomona College
 Garrison Starr (born 1975), American singer-songwriter
 George Reginald Starr (1904–1980), British organiser of a resistance network in France during World War II
 Georgina Starr (born 1968), English artist
 Harry W. Starr (1879–1934), American politician
 Henry Starr (1873–1921), American outlaw
 H. James Starr (1931–2008, American politician
 Irving Starr (1905–1982), American film producer
 Isaac Starr (1895–1989), American physician
 Jack Starr (Texas guitarist), American musician
 Jack Starr, American metal and blues guitarist and songwriter
 James Harper Starr (1809–1890), Surgeon General and Secretary of the Treasury of the Republic of Texas
 James Starr (philatelist) (1870–1948), American philatelist
 Jason Starr (born 1966), American author and screenplay writer
 Joeystarr (born 1967), French rapper of Martinican origin
 John Howard Starr (1898–1989), American Colgate University hockey coach
 John Renshaw Starr (1908–1996), artist and soldier in World War II
 John Robert Starr (1927–2000), American journalist and newspaper columnist
 Kay Starr (1922–2016), stage name of Katherine Starks, American jazz and popular music singer
 Keith Starr (born 1954), American professional basketball player for the Chicago Bulls
 Kenneth Starr (1946–2022), special prosecutor in the impeachment investigations of President Bill Clinton
 Kevin Starr (born 1940), historian and author, State Librarian of California
 Kimberley Starr (born 1970), Australian author
 Kinnie Starr (born 1970), Canadian singer-songwriter
  Leonard Starr (1925-2015), Illustrator, Comic Artist, Cartoonist)
 Lucille Starr (1938–2020), Canadian singer, songwriter, and yodeler
 Lucky Starr (singer) (born 1940), Australian singer
 Martin Starr (born 1982), American television and film actor
 Maurice Starr (born 1953), Boston-based musician, songwriter, and record producer
 Michael Starr (politician) (1910–2000), Canadian politician
 Michael Starr (singer) (born 1965), American singer, songwriter and musician
 Mike Starr (actor) (born 1950), American actor
 Mike Starr (musician) (1966–2011), American bassist in the band Alice in Chains
 Mortimer P. Starr (1917–1989), American microbiologist
 Nava Starr (born 1949), Canadian female chess player
 Patti Starr (born 1943), Canadian businesswoman
 Pearl Starr (1868–1925), American prostitute, bordello owner and businesswoman
 Phil Starr (1932–2005), cabaret comedian and singer
 Richard Starr (disambiguation)
 Ringo Starr (born 1940), English musician, drummer for The Beatles
 Ruby Starr (1949–1995), American singer
 Ryan Starr (born 1982), American Idol contestant
 Sable Starr (1957–2009), American rock and roll groupie
 Samuel H. Starr (1810–1891), American cavalry commander
 Stephen Starr, Philadelphia restaurateur
 Steven Starr (born 1957), American filmmaker and media activist
 Stevie Starr (born 1962), Scottish performance artist
 Susan Starr, American pianist
 Terrell Starr (1925–2009), American politician
 Tyler Starr (born 1991), American football linebacker
 Walter A. Starr, Jr. (1903–1933), American lawyer and mountain climber
 William Starr (disambiguation)

Fictional characters
 Brenda Starr, heroine of the Brenda Starr, Reporter comic strip
 Clive Starr, on the soap opera Family Affairs
 David "Lucky" Starr, hero of the Lucky Starr series of science fiction books by Isaac Asimov
 Dudley Starr, on the soap opera Family Affairs
 Elihas Starr or Egghead, a Marvel Comics character 
 Herr Starr, from the comic book Preacher
 Karen Starr or Power Girl, a DC Comics superheroine
 Poppy Starr, on the Nickelodeon comedy Lego City Adventures.

See also 
 Justice Starr (disambiguation)
 Star (name), given name and surname